Songs for the Philippines is a benefit album released in 2013. The album was produced as a fundraiser benefiting those affected by the 2013 Supertyphoon Haiyan in the Philippines, in which more than 6,300 people lost their lives. The artists, labels and managers all agreed to donate its proceeds to the Philippine Red Cross.

Track listing

References 

2013 compilation albums
Charity albums
Universal Records compilation albums